The Saint-Augustin River (Innu: Pakut-shipu) is a salmon river in the Côte-Nord region of Quebec, Canada. It empties into the Gulf of Saint Lawrence.

Location

The Saint-Augustin River has its source in the mountains of Labrador, and winds south to Saint-Augustin Bay.
 of the  main channel is in Labrador.
Major tributaries include Matse River, Michaels River, Rivière à la Mouche and Rivière Saint-Augustin Nord-Ouest.
The mouth of the river is in the municipality of Saint-Augustin in Le Golfe-du-Saint-Laurent Regional County Municipality.

At the mouth of the river the Pakuashipi ("sand river") Innu community is on the west shore and the village of Saint-Augustine is spread over hills on the east shore.
The two communities are accessible only by sea or air.
A barge is used to carry goods across the river, and a hovercraft takes passengers.
A new barge was due to be delivered in 2020.
The free passenger ferry takes five minutes to make the  crossing, but only runs between April and December.
After the river has frozen over it can be crossed by snowmobile over the "Route Blanche" ice bridge.

Name

Louis Jolliet (1645–1700) called the river Pegouasiou, and Jean-Baptiste-Louis Franquelin (1650–1712) called it Pegouachiou, meaning "deceptive river", probably given that name by the indigenous people because of it is shallow and the sandbars in its mouth are unstable.
The name Saint-Augustin was given to the river in the 18th century, and then to the village on the east shore of its mouth.
The name may refer to Augustin d'Hippone, a priest, or to Augustin le Gardeur de Courtemanche (1663–1717), first concessionaire of a strip of land that extended "from the river called Kegaska to that named Kesesakion".

Basin
It lies between the basins of the Kécarpoui River to the west and the Coxipi River to the east.
40.4% of the watershed is in Labrador. 
The Quebec portion is partly in the unorganized territory of Petit-Mécatina and partly in the municipality of Saint-Augustin.
The Pakuashipi Innu community is in the river basin.

The Saint-Augustin River has Strahler number 7.

A hydrometric station recorded flows from 1967 to 1982.

Environment

A map of the ecological regions of Quebec shows the river in sub-regions 6o-T, 6n-T and 6m-S of the east spruce/moss subdomain.
Land cover in the watershed is 74.3% forest, 12.9% non-forest vegetation, 3.1% barren, 1.3% wetlands and 8% water.

From the river mouth it is possible to see a wide variety of sea birds as well as seals and whales.
The St. Augustine Migratory Bird Sanctuary is a nesting area for seagull, tern, ring-billed gull, herring gull, penguin, black guillemot and common eider.

Fishing

The river is recognized as an Atlantic salmon (Salmo salar) river.
The Pourvoirie Kecarpoui arranges fishing/camping expeditions that include the Véco, Kécarpoui, Saint-Augustin, Coxipi, Chécatica and Napetipi rivers.

Notes

Sources

Rivers of Côte-Nord